Pseudopaludicola pusilla is a species of frog in the family Leptodactylidae.
It is found in Colombia and Venezuela.
Its natural habitats are subtropical or tropical dry forests, subtropical or tropical moist lowland forests, dry savanna, moist savanna, subtropical or tropical dry shrubland, subtropical or tropical dry lowland grassland, intermittent rivers, freshwater marshes, intermittent freshwater marshes, coast and pastureland.

References

Pseudopaludicola
Amphibians of Colombia
Amphibians of Venezuela
Taxonomy articles created by Polbot
Amphibians described in 1916